Tun Ahmad Koroh (born Thomas Koroh; 1 January 1925 – 25 June 1978) was the fifth Governor of the Malaysian state of Sabah. 

He was the nephew of Sedomon Gunsanad Kina and the second Governor to die in office just like his predecessor, Tun Mohd Hamdan Abdullah at the young age of 53, only after less than a year in office.

Honours

Honours of Malaysia
  : 
 Grand Commander of the Order of the Defender of the Realm (SMN) – Tun (1978)

References

1925 births
Converts to Islam from Christianity
1978 deaths
People from Sabah]
Kadazan-Dusun people
Yang di-Pertua Negeri of Sabah
Murut people
Grand Commanders of the Order of the Defender of the Realm